Ludwig Rosenfelder (July 18, 1813, in Breslau – April 18, 1881, in Königsberg) was a German painter and philosopher. He studied at Wilhelm Hensel and Wilhelm Ternite at Prussian Academy of Arts and specialized in religious and historical paintings.

References
 

1813 births
1881 deaths
Artists from Wrocław
People from the Province of Silesia
19th-century German painters
19th-century German male artists
German male painters
German philosophers
German male writers
Academic staff of Kunstakademie Königsberg